Dazhai Township is a township of Hua County, in the northeast of Henan province, China.

Anyang
Township-level divisions of Henan